Each team's roster for the 2014 IIHF World Championship consists of at least 15 skaters (forwards, and defencemen) and 2 goaltenders, and at most 22 skaters and 3 goaltenders. All sixteen participating nations, through the confirmation of their respective national associations, had to submit a roster by the first IIHF directorate meeting.


Legend

Belarus
A 25-player roster was announced on May 6.

Head coach: Glen Hanlon
Assistant coach: Oleg Mikulchik
Assistant coach: Eduard Zankovets

Skaters

Goaltenders

Canada
A 20-player roster was announced on April 17.

Head coach: Dave Tippett
Assistant coach: Peter DeBoer
Assistant coach: Paul Maurice

Skaters

Goaltenders

Czech Republic
A 27-player roster was announced on May 5.

Head coach: Vladimír Růžička
Assistant coach: Jaroslav Špaček
Assistant coach: Ondřej Weissmann

Skaters

Goaltenders

Denmark
A 24-player roster was announced on May 4.

Head coach: Janne Karlsson
Assistant coach: Tomas Jonsson
Assistant coach: Theis Møller-Hansen

Skaters

Goaltenders

Finland
A 25-player roster was announced on May 6.

Head coach: Erkka Westerlund
Assistant coach: Lauri Marjamäki
Assistant coach: Ari Moisanen
Assistant coach: Hannu Virta

Skaters

Goaltenders

France
A 25-player roster was announced on May 5.

Head coach: Dave Henderson
Assistant coach: Pierre Pousse

Skaters

Goaltenders

Germany
A 26-player roster was announced on May 7.

Head coach: Pat Cortina
Assistant coach: Helmut de Raaf
Assistant coach: Niklas Sundblad

Skaters

Goaltenders

Italy
A 25-player roster was announced on April 28.

Head coach: Tom Pokel
Assistant coach: Alexander Gschliesser
Assistant coach: Fabio Polloni

Skaters

Goaltenders

Kazakhstan
Head coach: Ari-Pekka Selin
Assistant coach: Raimo Helminen
Assistant coach: Timur Mukhameyan
Assistant coach: Yerlan Sagymbayev

Skaters

Goaltenders

Latvia
A 25-player roster was announced on May 7.

Head coach: Ted Nolan
Assistant coach: Tim Coolen
Assistant coach: Karlis Zirnis

Skaters

Goaltenders

Norway
A 25-player roster was announced on May 5.

Head coach: Roy Johansen
Assistant coach: Per-Erik Alcen
Assistant coach: Knut Jorgen Stubdal

Skaters

Goaltenders

Russia
A 26-player roster was announced on May 6.

Head coach: Oleg Znarok
Assistant coach: Oleg Kupriyanov
Assistant coach: Harijs Vītoliņš

Skaters

Goaltenders

Slovakia
A 25-player roster was announced on May 3.

Head coach: Vladimír Vůjtek
Assistant coach: Peter Oremus
Assistant coach: Vladimír Országh

Skaters

Goaltenders

Sweden
A 25-player roster was announced on May 6.

Head coach: Pär Mårts
Assistant coach: Rikard Grönborg
Assistant coach: Peter Popovic

Skaters

Goaltenders

Switzerland
A 26-player roster was announced on May 3.

Head coach: Sean Simpson
Assistant coach: Patrick Fischer
Assistant coach: Colin Muller

Skaters

Goaltenders

United States
A 25-player roster was announced on May 2.

Head coach: Peter Laviolette
Assistant coach: Don Granato
Assistant coach: Phil Housley
Assistant coach: Joe Sacco

Skaters

Goaltenders

References

Team rosters

Belarus
Canada
Czech Republic
Denmark
Finland
France
Germany
Italy

Kazakhstan
Latvia
Norway
Russia
Slovakia
Sweden
Switzerland
United States

Team statistics

Belarus
Canada
Czech Republic
Denmark
Finland
France
Germany
Italy

Kazakhstan
Latvia
Norway
Russia
Slovakia
Sweden
Switzerland
United States

rosters
IIHF World Championship rosters